The ABL 3x3 International Champions Cup, also known as the ABL 3x3 Cup, is a 3x3 basketball tournament held by the organizers of the ASEAN Basketball League.

Background
The ASEAN Basketball League was launched in 2009 as a traditional 5-a-side basketball league for Southeast Asian teams. The ABL would hold tournaments until 2020 when it was disrupted by the COVID-19 pandemic. As a precursor to resume the ABL in September 2022, the ABL 3x3 Cup was organized. The competition is not intended to be a one-off event and is part of the ABL's plans to expand to 3x3 basketball.

The inaugural edition was held from 16 to 17 April 2022 in Bali, Indonesia. Both men's and women's competitions were held.

Summary

Men's

Women's

References

3x3 basketball competitions
Recurring sporting events established in 2022